This is a list of flag bearers who have represented Zimbabwe at the Olympics.

Flag bearers carry the national flag of their country at the opening ceremony of the Olympic Games.

See also
Zimbabwe at the Olympics

References

Zimbabwe at the Olympics
Zimbabwe
Olympic flagbearers